Chile competed at the 2022 Winter Paralympics in Beijing, China which took place between 4–13 March 2022. Four alpine skiers represented Chile at the event.

Competitors
The following is the list of number of competitors participating at the Games per sport/discipline.

Alpine skiing

Chile sent four alpine skiers to compete in the Games.

See also
Chile at the Paralympics
Chile at the 2022 Winter Olympics

References

Nations at the 2022 Winter Paralympics
2022
Winter Paralympics